The Bangladesh Romanians are a migrant community of Bangladeshis who reside in Romania, and the term can also include their locally born descendants.

History
Bangladeshis come to Romania mostly as skilled workers. Their exact number is unknown. As of 2008, there were hundreds of Bangladeshis living in Romania.  However, due to the fact that Romania's workforce has decreased due to emigration, their numbers have increased since then and they are expected to increase in the future.

References

Romania
Ethnic groups in Romania